The nautch (meaning "dance" or "dancing") was a popular court dance performed by girls (known as "nautch girls") in India. The culture of the performing art of the nautch rose to prominence during the later period of Mughal Empire, and the rule of the East India Company. Over time, the nautch traveled outside the confines of the Imperial courts of the Mughals, the palaces of the Nawabs and the princely states, and the higher echelons of the officials of the British Raj, to the places of smaller zamindars.

Some references use the terms nautch and nautch girls to describe Devadasis who used to perform ritual and religious dances in the Hindu temples of India. However, there is not much similarity between the Devadasis and the nautch girls. The former performed dances, mostly Indian classical dances, including the ritual dances, in the precincts of the Hindu temples to please the temple deities, whereas the nautch girls performed nautches for the pleasure of men. In 1917, attributing the adjective to a woman in India would suggest her entrancing skill, tempting style and alluring costume could mesmerize men to absolute obedience.

History 
Earlier, devotional dances were performed in the temples by the devdasi for spiritual reasons only. During the mughal era, dance for entertainment became popular, and many rulers took dance girls in their entourages even at their battle-camps. The early British migrants to India were often given tawaifs as welcome gifts or rewards. In 18th century, young princes were sent to nautch girls to learn tehzeeb (elegance and court manners) and culture.

During the Mughal and British era, nautch girls regularly performed at durbars. Nautch girls were also invited to perform on the special events of the native Indians where guests congregated in a separate performance hall, nautch girls sat with the nautch party, composed of attendant musicians and two or more nautch girls, whose numbers vary depending on the status of the host.

Nautch

Nautch types 
The  nautch, performed only by the girls, evolved into several styles, three of which were most essential, the mor nach (the dance of peacock to attract peahens), patang nach (the kite dance imitating both the kite and the kite flier) and qahar ka nach (the palki pallbearer's dance, erotic and suggestive dance performed as finale) were popular types of dance.

Regional variations of the nautch 
The "zamindari nautch" patronised by the Zamindar of Baghmundi was known as the araiha, in which two or four nautch girls and two jhumar singers in company of about 20 male dancers took part in the singing and dancing. Part of the songs were repeated by the dancing girls and by the male dancers, and the nautch girls formed a line or a circle to perform a dance similar to the fox-trot as two or three sang, and they repeated the refrain.

Nautch party
The nautch girls performed in small troupes called the "nautch parties", which consisted of just one or two people to 10 or more, including dancers and singer, and their husbands often played the role of musicians and handlers.

Nautch girls

A nautch girl is a dancer who makes a living by entertaining men, women and children of all social classes, regions, castes and religions on various occasions including parties, weddings, christenings, religious ceremonies, and other social events. Their dances were simplified combination of kathak, dasi attam and folk dance. Wandering troops of nautch girls often traveled to different places, performed impromptu roadside dance performances or just turned up uninvited to perform at the homes of their richer patrons who were customarily obliged to pay them. They performed everywhere, in the homes of their patrons, public places or on stage, also in Mughal courts, palaces of nawabs, mahals (castles) of rajas, bungalows of British officers, homes of nobles, havelis (mansions) of zamindars (landowners) and many other places.

Nautch musicians

The nautch party musicians historically played four instruments: sarangi, tabla, manjeera and dholak. A fifth instrument, the harmonium, was introduced in the beginning of the 20th century. Musicians performed while standing in the courts, palaces and the homes of rich patrons. They performed while sitting in the homes of poor patrons and in public performances.  Singers of the nautch party used thumri, dadra, ghazal and geet.

Nautch handlers: mama and muhafiz 
A mama, usually an older experienced maidservant, who sat in a corner of the dais preparing paan (betel nut) and beedi (Indian cigar) for patrons, was responsible for taking care of nautch girls, their meals, and safekeeping of the jewelry worn by them. A muhafiz was an unarmed guard who maintained order, acted as usher, and ensured protection during performance and travel. Mashalchis (one or two lamp bearers) of the troupe were responsible for the lighting during night performances.

Famous nautch girls

Roopmati was a famous Hindu nautch girl from Saharanpur, who married Baz Bahadur, the Muslim sultan of Malwa.    Akbar the Great is said to have invaded Malwa after hearing about her beauty. In 1561 Akbar's army, led by Adham Khan and Pir Muhammad Khan, attacked Malwa and defeated Baz Bahadur in the battle of Sarangpur (29 March 1561). One of the reasons for Adham Khan's attack seems to be his lust for Rani Roopmati. She, however, poisoned herself upon hearing of the fall of Mandu. Baz Bahadur fled to Khandesh.

"Pyari Jan" was a famous nautch girl of Delhi in  1815.

Decline in patronage, shift towards prostitution

In the mid-nineteenth century, with the spread of western education and pressure from the increased number of Christian missionaries after the opening of the Suez Canal in 1869, dance was stigmatized and shunned by Europeans and Indians alike. Consequently, nautch girls abandoned by their patrons were often forced to take up prostitution for survival, and by the early 20th century the respectable art of the nautch had acquired a derogatory connotation.

See also

 Mujra 
 Ghawazi
 Bacha bazi 
 Dance bar (India)
 Devadasi
Indian folk dances
Tawaif
 The Nautch Girl (1891 opera)
 Prostitution in colonial India 
 Prostitution in India
 Prostitution in Pakistan

Further reading
Nautch Girls of India: Dancers, Singers, Playmates by Pran Nevile

References

External links
 The Nautch Girl, memoirs by James Forbes 

Indian female classical dancers
Performers of Indian classical dance
Culture of Uttar Pradesh